Yannick Zakri (born 26 March 1991) is an Ivorian footballer who plays as a forward for Duhok in the Iraqi Premier League.

International career

International goals
Scores and results list Ivory Coast's goal tally first.

References

External links 
 
 

1991 births
Living people
Ivorian footballers
Ivorian expatriate footballers
Ivory Coast international footballers
ASEC Mimosas players
Academie de Foot Amadou Diallo players
Mamelodi Sundowns F.C. players
Cape Town Spurs F.C. players
Maritzburg United F.C. players
Naft Al-Wasat SC players
Al-Faisaly SC players
South African Premier Division players
Association football forwards
Expatriate soccer players in South Africa
Expatriate footballers in Iraq
Expatriate footballers in Jordan
Ivorian expatriate sportspeople in South Africa
Ivorian expatriate sportspeople in Iraq
Ivory Coast A' international footballers
2016 African Nations Championship players
Duhok SC players